Aaron DeLoach (born December 13, 1983 in St. Louis, Missouri) is an American professional soccer player.

Career

College
DeLoach played club soccer for the Busch Soccer Club in St. Louis, and went on to play college soccer at Florida Southern College. He led the Florida Southern team in minutes played and in assists in 2003 and 2004. He was the team captain from 2004 to 2006.

Professional
Undrafted out of college, DeLoach signed with the Charlotte Eagles in the USL Second Division in 2007. He made his professional debut on April 20, 2007, in Charlotte's 2007 season opener against Crystal Palace Baltimore, but only played three more games in his three years with the team, and was released at the end of 2009.

After his release from the team, and having been unable to secure a professional contract elsewhere, DeLoach signed to play for the DFW Tornados in the PDL in 2010. He scored a goal in his debut for the team on May 7, 2010, against the El Paso Patriots. DeLoach spent the 2012 preseason with the Fort Lauderdale Strikers of the North American Soccer League, but was unable to reach a contract agreement.

Non-soccer work
In addition to his playing career, DeLoach was Charlotte's Director of Urban Ministry. He was an integral part of the Eagles’ sports ministry strategy in the city of Charlotte, working daily in the more deprived areas of East Charlotte. He started a tutoring program with to help continue the furthering education of the youth in those areas, helped start three youth soccer teams, and is the director of inner-city and Latino camps which are conducted by the Eagles Learn from the Pros Camp Program. Since then has gone on to coach college soccer at Southwestern Assemblies of God University and Palm Beach Atlantic University. DeLoach currently serves as the Student Ministry Pastor at Christ Fellowship Church in West Palm Beach, Florida.

References

External links
 Charlotte Eagles bio

1983 births
Living people
American soccer players
Charlotte Eagles players
DFW Tornados players
USL Second Division players
USL League Two players
Association football forwards